Bazaruto (from Ushurutswa, island of the mist) is a sandy island located approximately  southeast of the mouth of the Save River, Mozambique. It is the largest island in the Bazaruto Archipelago and in the Bazaruto National Park.

The warm, southward-flowing Mozambique Current seems to contribute to the increasing buildup of the sandy coastline. Because the water along this coastal area is very clear, much of the sub-surface channel pattern around the island is discernible. Several narrow lines of plankton bloom parallel the shoreline on the satellite photo below. Bazaruto Archipelago holds the largest population of dugong in Mozambique (around 300 animals), almost certainly is the last remaining viable population of dugongs left off East Africa. The coastal plains show numerous lakes and a swampy environment that appears to be karst topography. Underlying the area is limestone rock that has eroded into a pockmarked landscape, creating water-filled sinkholes. Rainfall in this humid tropical climate amounts to around 850 mm (33 inches) annually, largely concentrated in the months December to March.

The closest mainland town to the island of Bazaruto is Inhassoro, although administratively it belongs to the Vilankulo District and Inhambane Province.

Popular culture 
Bazaruto Island was the location of Prize Island, a British television game show produced by Endemol for ITV. The series aired from 27 October to 1 December 2013.

Sport fishing 
A 7.90kg (17lb 6oz) Brassy trevally caught off of Bazaruto Island stands as the IGFA all tackle world record for the species. The IGFA world record Blacktip trevally was also taken off of Bazaruto Island.

References

 National Aeronautic and Space Administration
  www.Bazaruto.org
 Bazaruto Island - Beautiful Sandy Island
 The Bazaruto National Park

Bazaruto Archipelago
Geography of Inhambane Province
Islands of Mozambique